Razdornoye is a rural locality (a selo) in Krasnogvardeysky District, Belgorod Oblast, Russia. The population was 635 as of 2010. There are 4 streets.

Geography 
Razdornoye is located 26 km west of Biryuch (the district's administrative centre) by road. Gredyakino is the nearest rural locality.

References 

Rural localities in Krasnogvardeysky District, Belgorod Oblast